Riverside is a neighborhood in Baltimore, Maryland, United States that lies just to the south of the city's Federal Hill, Baltimore.  The neighborhood is centered around Riverside Park (Baltimore) and includes the Baltimore Museum of Industry. The southwest portion of Riverside corresponds to the Port Covington district under major development, which currently houses The Baltimore Sun, the Under Armour Waterfront HQ Campus, as well as the Cruise Maryland Terminal of the Port of Baltimore. Riverside is registered as Riverside Historic District (Baltimore, Maryland) on the National Register of Historic Places.

References

 
Neighborhoods in Baltimore
South Baltimore